The HŽ Series 2062 is a class of diesel-electric locomotives belonging to Croatian Railways. They are examples of the EMD G26 locomotive series.

Prior to the breakup of Yugoslavia, when in use with JŽ these locos were classified as JŽ 664-0. Of the original 64 JŽ locomotives, 56 found their way to HŽ, with the remainder in use with ŽS.

HŽ have modernised 20 class 2062s, reclassifying them as 2062-1s. The work was carried out by Gredelj & Turner.

The main usage for 2062s is in Lika, Dalmatia, Istria with a few in Slavonia. The -1 subclass is used only on Lika-Dalmatia services.

References

External links 
TEHNIČKE KARAKTERISTIKE VUČNIH VOZILA
 MODERNIZATION AND RECONSTRUCTION OF LOCOMOTIVE SERIES 2 062 (G26 CW)

General Motors Diesel locomotives
Co′Co′ locomotives
Co-Co locomotives
664
2062
Railway locomotives introduced in 1972
Đuro Đaković (company)
Co'Co' Diesel Locomotives of Europe